Tracey Rose is a South African artist who lives and works in Johannesburg. Rose is best known for her performances, video installations, and photographs.

Biography 
Rose was born in 1974 in Durban, South Africa. She attended the University of the Witwatersrand in Johannesburg in Fine Arts where she obtained her B.A. in 1996. She taught at Vaal Triangle Technikon, Vanderbijl Park, South Africa and at the University of the Witwatersrand. In February and March 2001 she was artist-in-residence in Cape Town at the South African National Gallery where she developed her work for the Venice Biennale 2001 curated by Harald Szeemann. 
Tracey Rose is represented in the US by Christian Haye of The Project.

Work 

Rose's work responds to the limitations of dogma and the flaws in institutionalized cultural discourse. Her practice, which is known for centering on performance, also includes photography, video, and installation.  Always evident in her work is the artist's insistence in confronting the politics of identity, including sexual, racial, and gender-based themes. According to Jan Avgikos, "part of Rose's appeal is her fluid referencing of '60s and '70s performance art".

 The Thinker, found object and text, 1996. A small reproduction of the sculpture The Thinker by Auguste Rodin used as a weapon in a family argument.
 Span I and Span II, 1997. The work was presented at the second Johannesburg Biennale in the show Graft curated by Colin Richards, 1997. The work was also presented at the Dakar Biennale in 2000.
 Ongetiteld (Untitled). A video made with surveillance cameras in which she shaves off all of her body hair. The work was presented in Democracy's Images, Bildmuseet in Umeå in Sweden, 1998.
 TKO, 2000.
 Ciao Bella, 2001. The work was produced for the Venice Biennale 2001.
 Lolita, 2001, lambda photograph, 120 x 120 cm.
 The Kiss, 2001, lambda photograph.
 Venus Baartman, 2001, lambda photograph, 120 x 120 cm.
 Half A, 2003, digital print, 55 x 37.5 cm.
 Lucie's Fur Version 1:1:1 – La Messie, 2003, lambda photograph, 148 x 102 cm.
 The Prelude The Gardenpath, 2006, DVD.

Exhibitions 
According to Sue Williamson, "Tracey Rose is not a practitioner who jumps at every curatorial opportunity offered her, and has been known to withdraw from more than one exhibition if the circumstances have not seemed right." 
Rose's work has been widely exhibited in Africa, Europe and the United States. Recent solo exhibitions include "The Cockpit" at MC, Los Angeles, CA, "Plantation Lullabies" at Goodman Gallery, Johannesburg, South Africa, both in 2008.

Recent group exhibitions include "El mirall sud-africà" at the Centre De Cultura Contemporània De Barcelona, Spain, "Mouth Open, Teeth Showing: Major Works from the True Collection" at the Henry Art Gallery in Seattle, "Memories of Modernity" in Malmo, Sweden, "Check List: Luanda Pop" at the African Pavilion in the 52nd Venice Biennale, Italy, "Heterotopias" at the Thessaloniki Biennale in Greece, and "Global Feminisms" at The Elizabeth A. Sackler Center for Feminist Art in Brooklyn, New York (all 2007), and the 11th Lyon Biennale "A terrible beauty is born" in 2011.

Caryatid & BinneKant Die Wit Does and Imperfect Performance: A tale in Two States are among her most recent live performances, seen at the Düsseldorf Art Fair in Germany, and the Moderna Museet in Stockholm, Sweden, respectively. In 2001 Rose was also included in "Plateau de l'humanite" in the 49th Venice Biennale curated by Harald Szeemann.

Solo exhibitions 
 The Project, New York, 1999
 The Goodman Gallery, Johannesburg, 2000
 The Project, New York, 2000
 Ciao Bella, The Goodman Gallery, Johannesburg, 2002
 The Project, New York, 2002
 The Project, New York City, 2004
 The Thieveing Fuck and the Intagalactic Lay, The Goodman Gallery, Johannesburg, 2004
 The Project, New York City, NY, 2007
 Plantation Lullabies, The Goodman Gallery, Johannesburg, 2008
 The Cockpit, MC Kunst, Los Angeles, 2008
 Raison d'être, Espace doual'art, Douala, 2009
 Shooting down Babylon, ZEITZ MOCAA, 2021

Group exhibitions 

 Scramble, Civic Theatre Gallery, Johannesburg, South Africa, 1996
 Hitch-hiker, Generator Art Space, Johannesburg, South Africa, 1996
 Graft-Trade Routes History and Geography, (catalogue) 2nd Johannesburg Biennale, South African National Gallery, Cape Town, South Africa, 1997
 50 Stories (co-curator), "Top of Africa" Carlton Centre, Johannesburg, South Africa, 1997
 Cross/ings, (catalogue) Museum of Contemporary Art, Tampa, USA, 1997
 FNB Vita Awards, (catalogue) Sandton Art Gallery, Johannesburg, 1997
 Purity and Danger, Gertrude Posel Gallery, Johannesburg, South Africa, 1997
 7th Triennale der Klienplastik, (catalogue) Europe Africa, SudwestLB Forum, Stuttgart, Germany, 1998
 Guagrene Arte 98, Fondazione Sandretto Re Rebaudengo per l'arte, Turino, Italy, 1998
 Democracy's Images, (catalogue) Photography and Visual Art After Apartheid, Bildmuseet, Umea, Sweden, 1998
 Dark Continent, Klein Karoo Nasionale Kunstefees, Oudtshoorn, South Africa, 1998
 Art of the World 1998, (catalogue) Passage de Retz, Paris, France, 1998
 Video Cult/ures ZKM, Museum fur Neue Kunst, Karlsruhe, Germany, 1999
 Channel, South African National Gallery, Cape Town, South Africa, 1999
 Dialog: Vice Verses, (catalogue) Europe Africa, SudwestLB Forum, Stuttgart, Germany, 1999
 2000 ArtPace, San Antonio (residency)
documenta 14 exhibition, Athens, Greece and Kassel, Germany, 2017
“May You Live In Interesting Times”, 58th Venice Biennale, Italy, 2019.

Interviews and press 

 Nkgopoleng Moloi. 2018. Through the language of performance Tracey Rose creates art that refuses to settle. Bubblegum Club.
 Zaza Hlalethwa. 2019. More than one layer to the art and life of Tracey Rose. Mail and Guardian.
 Carli Collison. 2022. The calling of Tracey Rose. Mail and Guardian.
 Sindi-Leigh McBride. 2022. The courage and catharsis of Tracey Rose. News24.

Scholarly influence 

 Boulle, C. & Pather, J. 2019. Acts of Transgression. WITS Press: Johannesburg

References

Bibliography 
 Sue Williamson, A feature on an artist in the public eye: Tracey Rose in "Artthrob", n. 43, March 2001.
 Tracey Rose: Fresh, edited by Kellie Jones and Emma Bedford, South African National Gallery, 2003.
 Emma Bedford, Tracey Rose in 10 years 100 artists: art in a democratic South Africa, ed. Sophie Perryer, Struik, 2004.
 Tracey Murinik, Tracey Rose: plasticienne, Les Carnets de la création, Carnets de la création: Afrique du sud, Éditions de l'Oeil, Paris, 2005.
 Pensa, Iolanda (Ed.) 2017. Public Art in Africa. Art et transformations urbaines à Douala /// Art and Urban Transformations in Douala. Genève: Metis Presses.

External links 

1974 births
Living people
20th-century South African women artists
21st-century South African women artists
South African contemporary artists
People from Johannesburg
Women performance artists